The mottle-backed elaenia (Elaenia gigas) is a species of bird in the family Tyrannidae. It is found in Bolivia, Colombia, Ecuador, and Peru.

Its natural habitats are subtropical or tropical moist shrubland and heavily degraded former forest.

References 

mottle-backed elaenia
Birds of the Ecuadorian Amazon
Birds of the Peruvian Amazon
mottle-backed elaenia
mottle-backed elaenia
Taxonomy articles created by Polbot